Vesa Tauriainen (born 16 December 1967) is a Finnish former international footballer.

Coaching career
In September 2020, Tauriainen's contract with RoPs was terminated, and he was replaced as head coach by Mikko Mannila.

Personal life
He is the brother of fellow professional footballers Pasi Tauriainen and Kimmo Tauriainen, and the uncle of Jimi Tauriainen and Julius Tauriainen.

Career statistics

Club

Notes

International

Notes

References

1967 births
Living people
People from Rovaniemi
Sportspeople from Lapland (Finland)
Finnish footballers
Finnish football managers
Finnish expatriate footballers
Finland youth international footballers
Finland international footballers
Association football forwards
Veikkausliiga players
Kakkonen players
Rovaniemen Palloseura players
FC Oulu players
Helsingin Jalkapalloklubi players
FF Jaro players
FC Santa Claus players
Finnish expatriate sportspeople in Sweden
Expatriate footballers in Sweden